Tired Theodore (Swedish: Trötte Teodor) is a 1945 Swedish comedy film directed by Anders Henrikson and starring Max Hansen, Annalisa Ericson and Tollie Zellman. It was shot at the Sundbyberg Studios in Stockholm. The film's sets were designed by the art director Max Linder. It is based on the 1913 German play of the same title by Max Ferner and Max Neal which has been adapted for the screen a number of times.

Synopsis
Theodore is happy about his marriage to his beloved Marianne, but unfortunately his domineering new mother-in-law comes to live with them.

Cast
 Max Hansen as Teodor
 Annalisa Ericson as Marianne
 Tollie Zellman as 	Mrs. Johansson
 Anders Henrikson as 	Andersson
 Inga-Bodil Vetterlund as	Clary
 Bojan Westin as 	Eva
 Sven Lindberg as 	Konrad
 Hilda Borgström as 	Countess
 Åke Claesson as The President
 Carl Reinholdz as Friend
 Emile Stiebel as 	Bellini

References

Bibliography 
 Wright, Rochelle. The Visible Wall: Jews and Other Ethnic Outsiders in Swedish Film. SIU Press, 1998.

External links 
 

1945 films
Swedish comedy films
1945 comedy films
1940s Swedish-language films
Films directed by Anders Henrikson
Swedish films based on plays
1940s Swedish films